Marilyn Gunner is a physics professor at the City College of New York (CUNY) and a Fellow of the American Physical Society. She is known for her work on molecular biophysics and structural biology.

Education 
Gunner received her B.A. from the State University of New York (Binghamton).  She completed her Ph.D. in 1988 at the University of Pennsylvania, where she worked on topics such as electron transfer in proteins with Leslie Dutton.

Career and Research 
Gunner previously worked in the lab of Barry Honig at Columbia University, where she studied electrostatic control of proteins.   She is now a Professor in the Physics Department at CUNY where she has continued to study protein interactions.  As of 2021, her 140 publications have been cited over 5,800 times.  She is the lead investigator of the Multi-Conformation Continuum Electrostatics (MCCE) project, which is "a biophysics simulation program combining continuum electrostatics and molecular mechanics."  Gunner was also part of a collaboration which measured the efficiency of energy storage in cyanobacteria, work that could have implications for astrobiology.

In 2006, Gunner served as the chair of the Division of Biological Physics in the American Physical Society. She currently serves as a member of the Editorial Board for both the Journal of the Royal Society Interface and Biochimica et Biophysica Acta – Bioenergetics.  Gunner has also served as both a general member and as a member of the Board of Directors for the Telluride Science Research Center.

Awards and recognition 

 The Presidential Early Career Award for Scientists and Engineers (1996): "For biophysics of proteins"
 Fellow of the American Physical Society, Division of Biological Physics (2007): "For her work in both experimental and theoretical studies of electron and proton transfer processes in proteins, in particular for her beautiful work coupling the theory of electrostatic interactions to the dynamics of charge transfer in photosynthetic reaction centers , and in recognition of her service to the Division of Biological Physics."

References 

City University of New York faculty
Fellows of the American Physical Society
21st-century American physicists
Living people
Year of birth missing (living people)
Recipients of the Presidential Early Career Award for Scientists and Engineers